Atago Shrine (愛宕神社, Atago jinja) is a Shinto shrine located in Sendai, Miyagi Prefecture, Japan. It enshrines the kami Kagu-tsuchi (軻遇土神), and its annual festival takes place on July 24.

See also
List of Shinto shrines in Japan

External links
Official website

Shinto shrines in Miyagi Prefecture